Scott Township is one of the fifteen townships of Marion County, Ohio, United States.  The 2010 census found 498 people in the township.

Geography
Located in the northeastern part of the county, it borders the following townships:
Dallas Township, Crawford County - north
Whetstone Township, Crawford County - northeast corner
Tully Township - east
Canaan Township, Morrow County - southeast corner
Claridon Township - south
Marion Township - southwest corner
Grand Prairie Township - west

No municipalities are located in Scott Township, although the unincorporated community of Kirkpatrick lies in the northern part of the township.

Name and history
Statewide, other Scott Townships are located in Adams, Brown, and Sandusky counties.

Government
The township is governed by a three-member board of trustees, who are elected in November of odd-numbered years to a four-year term beginning on the following January 1. Two are elected in the year after the presidential election and one is elected in the year before it. There is also an elected township fiscal officer, who serves a four-year term beginning on April 1 of the year after the election, which is held in November of the year before the presidential election. Vacancies in the fiscal officership or on the board of trustees are filled by the remaining trustees.

Police protection in Scott Township is provided by the Marion County Sheriff’s Department.

Education
Children in Scott Township attend one of two different school systems: those from the western part of the township attend the Ridgedale Local School District, while those from the eastern part attend the River Valley Local School District.

References

External links
County website

Townships in Marion County, Ohio
Townships in Ohio